Adrian Olah (born 30 April 1981 in Târgu Mureș) is a former Romanian footballer who played as a defender and as a midfielder. He is a currently the manager of the youth squad Juvenes Târgu Mureș.

Club career
Olah made his debut in the Divizia A during the 1998/1999 season at FC Național where he kept on playing until the summer of 2005, when he moved to FCU Politehnica Timișoara as part of the deal which had brought Gigel Coman, Gabriel Cânu, Marius Popa and Gabriel Caramarin to Timișoara earlier that year.

External links

 
 
 

1981 births
Living people
Romanian footballers
Romanian people of Hungarian descent
Sportspeople from Târgu Mureș
FC Politehnica Timișoara players
FC Universitatea Cluj players
FC Progresul București players
CSM Unirea Alba Iulia players
CS Turnu Severin players
AFC Săgeata Năvodari players
FC Politehnica Iași (2010) players
Liga I players
Liga II players
Association football midfielders